The  1971 WFA Cup Final was the 1st final of the WFA Cup, England's primary cup competition for women's football teams. The showpiece event was played under the auspices of the Women's Football Association (WFA). Southampton Women's F.C. and Stewarton Thistle contested the match at Crystal Palace National Sports Centre in London on 9 May 1971. Southampton Women's F.C. won the match 4-1.

Match

Summary

The game ended 4-1 to Southampton Women's F.C.

Aftermath

Southampton were fined for misrepresenting themselves as a league club. Southampton were fined £25.

Bibliography

References

Cup
Women's FA Cup finals
WFA Cup Final